The First Army was a Prussian formation during the Austro-Prussian War. Being a wartime organization of the Prussian Army; it afterwards was demobilized.

Formation 
For the Austro-Prussian War the Prussians organized their forces into three, and eventually four, field armies. Helmuth von Moltke, Chief of the Prussian General Staff, assigned four corps to attack the area of the Austria-allied kingdoms of Hanover and Saxony. The command of the First Army was given to Prince Friedrich Karl of Prussia, a nephew of King William of Prussia. The young General der Kavallerie had served in the First Schleswig War and Second Schleswig War and already received the prestigious Pour le Mérite with oak leaves. Chief of Staff was to be Generalleutnant Konstantin Bernhard von Voigts-Rhetz, who was an intelligent but opinionated officer.

Course of war 
During the war the First Army did not operate effectively in the opinion of the war-directing General Staff. Prince Friedrich Karl's marching orders strained the army's supply lines and prevented a link with Second Army. Fortunately the First Army was able to link up with the Army of the Elbe, commanded by Karl Eberhard Herwarth von Bittenfeld. On June 28th both armies operated against Mnichovo Hradiště which turned into the Battle of Münchengrätz. The prince then ordered the 3rd Division to march to Jičín. Even though the campaign was successful many men died before reaching the battlefields. The combined operation of two armies worsened the already bad supply situation. When the armies marched separately again the First Army was the first in the Battle of Königgrätz, fighting against the Austrians under Ludwig von Benedek until the Second Army of Crown-Prince Frederick William of Prussia arrived.

Order of Battle 
The First Army had the following order of battle:

Commanding General: General der Kavallerie Prince Friedrich Karl of Prussia
Chief of Staff: Generalleutnant Konstantin Bernhard von Voigts-Rhetz
Quartermaster General: Generalmajor Ferdinand von Stülpnagel
Chief of Artillery: Generalmajor Albert von Lengsfeld
Chief Engineer: Generalmajor Karl Keiser

II Corps 
Commanding General: Generalleutnant Stephan von Schmidt
Chief of Staff: Generalmajor Georg von Kameke

 3rd Division August von Werder
 5th Infantry Brigade Ludwig von Januschowski
 Grenadier-Regiment „König Friedrich Wilhelm IV.“ (1. Pommersches) Nr. 2 Oberst Ernst von Reichenbach
 5. Pommersches Infanterie-Regiment Nr. 42 Oberst Ferdinand von Borcke
 6th Infantry Brigade Karl Friedrich Wilhelm von Winterfeldt
 3. Pommersches Infanterie-Regiment Nr. 14 Oberst Alexander von Stahr
 7. Pommersches Infanterie-Regiment Nr. 54 Oberstleutnant Benno von Kurowski
 Pommersches Jäger-Bataillon Nr. 2
 Division Cavalry Pomeranian Hussar Regiment No. 5 Oberst Tamm von Flemming
 4th Division Friedrich Herwarth von Bittenfeld
 7th Infantry Brigade, Ludwig von Schlabrendorff
 2. Pommersches Grenadier-Regiment (Colberg) Nr. 9, Oberst Karl Gustav von Sandrart
 6. Pommersches Infanterie-Regiment Nr. 49, Oberst Gustav von Wietersheim
 8th Infantry Brigade, Bernhard von Hanneken
 4. Pommersches Infanterie-Regiment Nr. 21, Oberst Franz von Krane-Matena
 8. Pommersches Infanterie-Regiment Nr. 61, Oberst Hermann von Michaelis
 Divisions Kavallerie 1. Pommersches Ulanen-Regiment Nr. 4, Oberst Fedor von Kleist
 Korps-Reserve Artillerie, Oberst von Puttkammer

III Corps 
Directly subordinate to the army

 5th Division Wilhelm von Tümpling
 9th Infantry Brigade Genarlamajor Gustav von Schimmelmann
 Grenadier-Regiment „König Friedrich Wilhelm IV.“ (1. Pommersches) Nr. 2 Oberst Ernst von Reichenbach
 5. Pommersches Infanterie-Regiment Nr. 42 Oberst Ferdinand von Borcke
 10th Infantry Brigade Wilhelm von Kamienski
 2. Pommersches Infanterie-Regiment Nr. 14 Oberst Kolmar von Debschitz
 1. Pommersches Infanterie-Regiment Nr. 54 Oberst Karl von Kettler
 Division Cavalry Pomeranian Hussar Regiment No. 5 Oberstleutnant Eugen von Treskow
 6th Division Albrecht Gustav von Manstein
 11th Infantry Brigade, Hermann von Gersdorff
 Brandenburgisches Füsilier-Regiment Nr. 35, Oberst Louis von Rothmaler
 7. Brandenburgisches Infanterie-Regiment Nr. 64, Oberst Ernst von Hartmann
 12th Infantry Brigade, Bernhard von Hanneken
 4. Brandenburgisches Infanterie-Regiment Nr. 24, Oberst Emil von Hacke
 8. Pommersches Infanterie-Regiment Nr. 61, Oberst Johann von Götz und Schwanenflies
 Divisions Kavallerie Brandenburgisches Dragoner-Regiment Nr. 2, Oberstleutnant Carl Heinichen

IV Corps 
Directly subordinate to the army

 7th Division, Eduard von Fransecky
 13. Infanterie-Brigade, Julius von Groß
 1. Magdeburgisches Infanterie-Regiment Nr. 26, Oberst Alexander von Medem
 3. Magdeburgisches Infanterie-Regiment Nr. 66, Oberst Adolf von Blanckensee
 14. Infanterie-Brigade, Generalmajor Helmuth von Gordon
 2. Magdeburgisches Infanterie-Regiment Nr. 27, Oberst Franz von Zychlinski
 4. Magdeburgisches Infanterie-Regiment Nr. 67, Oberst Eduard von Bothmer
 Divisions Kavallerie Magdeburgisches Husaren-Regiment Nr. 10, Oberst Hermann von Besser
 8. Division, August von Horn
 15. Infanterie-Brigade, Julius von Bose
 1. Thüringisches Infanterie-Regiment Nr. 31, Oberst Louis von Freyhold
 3. Thüringisches Infanterie-Regiment Nr. 71, Oberst Karl von Avemann
 16. Infanterie-Brigade (Deutsches Kaiserreich), Leopold von Stuckrad
 4. Thüringisches Infanterie-Regiment Nr. 72, Oberst von Bruno Neidhardt von Gneisenau
 Magdeburgisches Jäger-Bataillon Nr. 4
 Divisions Kavallerie Thüringisches Ulanen-Regiment Nr. 6, Oberstleutnant Ferdinand August von Langermann und Erlencamp

Cavalry Corps 
Commanding General: General der Kavallerie Prince Albert of Prussia
Chief of Staff: Oberstleutnant Karl von Witzendorff

 1st Cavalry Division, Hermann von Alvensleben
 1. Leichte Kavallerie-Brigade, Generalmajor Albert von Rheinbaben
 1. Garde-Ulanen-Regiment, Oberst Enno von Colomb
 2. Garde-Ulanen-Regiment, Oberst Wilhelm von Brandenburg
 1. Garde-Dragoner-Regiment, Oberstleutnant Friedrich Magnus von Barner
 2. Schwere Kavallerie-Brigade, Generalmajor Wolf von Pfuel
 Brandenburgisches Kürassier-Regiment Nr. 6, Oberst Alfred von Rauch
 Magdeburgisches Kürassier-Regiment, Oberst Hiob von Hontheim
 2nd Cavalry Division, Benno Hann von Weyhern
 2. Leichte Kavallerie-Brigade, Generalmajor Wilhelm zu Mecklenburg-Schwerin
 2. Garde-Dragoner-Regiment, Oberst Hermann von Redern
 Brandenburgisches Husaren-Regiment (Zietensche Husaren) Nr. 3, Oberstleutnant Adalbert von Kalkreuth
 2. Brandenburgisches Ulanen Regiment Nr. 1, Oberstleutnant Friedrich Wilhelm zu Hohenlohe-Ingelfingen
 3. Leichte Kavallerie-Brigade, Generalmajor Georg von der Groeben
 Neumärkisches Dragoner Regiment Nr. 3, Oberstleutnant Karl von Willisen
 Thüringisches Husaren-Regiment Nr. 12, Oberst Gustav von Barnekow

The following detached units also belonged to the corps:

 1. Schwere Kavallerie-Brigade, Generalmajor Prince Albert of Prussia
 Regiment der Gardes du Corps, Oberst Friedrich von Brandenburg
 Garde-Kürassier-Regiment, Oberstleutnant Hermann von Lüderitz
 3. Schwere Kavallerie-Brigade, Generalmajor Wasa von der Goltz
 Kürassier-Regiment „Königin“ (Pommersches) Nr. 2, Oberst August von Schaevenbach
 2. Pommersches Ulanen-Regiment Nr. 9, Oberst Otto von Diepenbroick-Grüter

See also 
 Königgrätz order of battle

References

Literature 
 
 
 

Units and formations of the Prussian Army
Austro-Prussian War
Field armies of Germany